Leucanthemum is a genus of flowering plants in the aster family, Asteraceae. It is mainly distributed in southern and central Europe. Some species are known on other continents as introduced species, and some are cultivated as ornamental plants. The name Leucanthemum derives from the Greek words λευκός – leukos ("white") and ἄνθεμον – anthemon ("flower").  Common names for Leucanthemum species usually include the name daisy (e.g. ox-eye daisy, Shasta daisy), but "daisy" can also refer to numerous other genera in the Asteraceae family.

Description
Leucanthemum species are perennial plants growing from red-tipped rhizomes. The plant produces one erect stem usually reaching 40 to 130 centimeters tall, but known to exceed 2 meters at times. It is branching or unbranched and hairy to hairless. Some species have mainly basal leaves, and some have leaves along the stem, as well. Some leaves are borne on petioles, and others are sessile, attached to the stem at their bases. They vary in shape, and some are lobed or toothed.

The flower head is solitary, paired, or in a group of three on the stem. The base of the head is layered with up to 60 or more rough-edged phyllaries. The Leucanthemum head has about 13 to 34 ray florets of various widths, occasionally more, and rarely none. The ray florets are always white but fade pink with age. The head has over 100 yellow disc florets at the center. The fruit is a ribbed, hairless cypsela.

Ecology
Leucanthemum species are used as food plants by the larvae of some Lepidoptera species, including the bucculatricid leaf-miners Bucculatrix argentisignella, B. leucanthemella, and B. nigricomella, which feed exclusively on Leucanthemum vulgare.

Diversity
Species include:

Leucanthemum adustum Gremli
Leucanthemum aligulatum Vogt
Leucanthemum aragonense (Asso) Samp.
Leucanthemum atratum (Jacq.) DC.
Leucanthemum burnatii Briq. & Cavill.
Leucanthemum catalaunicum Vogt
Leucanthemum coronopifolium Vill.
Leucanthemum corsicum (Less.) DC.
Leucanthemum cuneifolium H.J.Coste
Leucanthemum discoideum (All.) Coste
Leucanthemum gaudinii Dalla Torre
Leucanthemum glaucophyllum (Briq. & Cavill.) Jahand.
Leucanthemum gracilicaule (Dufour) Pau
Leucanthemum graminifolium (L.) Lam.
Leucanthemum grande (L.) P.Giraud
Leucanthemum halleri Ducommun
Leucanthemum heterophyllum (Willd.) DC.
Leucanthemum illyricum Vogt & Greuter
Leucanthemum ircutianum (Turcz.) Turcz. ex DC.
Leucanthemum lacustre (Brot.) Samp.
Leucanthemum latifolium DC.
Leucanthemum lithopolitanicum (E.Mayer) Polatschek
Leucanthemum maximum (Ramond) DC. – max chrysanthemum
Leucanthemum maestracense Vogt & F.H.Hellw.
Leucanthemum meridionale Legrand
Leucanthemum minimum Vill.
Leucanthemum monspeliense (L.) H.J.Coste
Leucanthemum montserratianum Vogt
Leucanthemum pallens DC.
Leucanthemum paludosum (Poir.) Bonnet & Barratte
Leucanthemum platylepis Borbás
Leucanthemum rohlenae Vogt & Greuter
Leucanthemum rotundifolium DC.
Leucanthemum sibiricum DC.
Leucanthemum subglaucum De Laramb.
Leucanthemum × superbum (Bergmans ex J.W.Ingram) D.H.Kent – Shasta daisy
Leucanthemum sylvaticum (Brot.) Nyman
Leucanthemum tridactylites (A.Kern. & Huter) Huter & al.
Leucanthemum virgatum (Desr.) Clos
Leucanthemum visianii (Gjurašin) Vogt & Greuter
Leucanthemum vulgare (Vaill.) Lam. – ox-eye daisy

Hybrid
 Leucanthemum × superbum ( = L. lacustre × L. maximum) – Shasta daisy

Gallery

References

External links
 
 
 GRIN Species Records of Leucanthemum

Asteraceae genera
Taxa named by Philip Miller